The Plaza de toros Nuevo Progreso is a bullring in the Mexican city of Guadalajara, Jalisco. It is currently used for bull fighting and also for hosting musical events, and professional wrestling events. The bullring holds 16,561 people and was built in 1966 to 1967.

Architect Jose Manuel Gomez Vazquez Aldana made the executive project and drew up the plans for the new bullring, and this one was built by architects Leopoldo Torres Águila, Manuel Parga, and Gorki Guido Bayardo, and civil engineers Mario Quiñones, Alfonso Ortega Pérez, and Mario Fernández.

The main promoter and first owner of the plaza was Leodegario Hernández (Arandas, Jalisco, 24 January 1920 - 22 January 1987), a show business promoter and entrepreneur.

The first name of this venue was Plaza Monumental, and was inaugurated on Saturday, 4 February 1967, when six bulls bred in the facilities of cattle breeder José Julián Llaguno, were fought by matadors Joselito Huerta, Raúl Contreras "Finito", and Manolo Martínez.

Leodegario Hernández went through a streak of bad business, and in 1971 he decided to sell the plaza to his competitor, Ignacio García-Aceves.

The bullring was remodeled in 1979 and since that year is called Nuevo Progreso.

Espectáculos Taurinos de México, Sociedad Anónima (ETMSA), a company led by Mexican billionaire Alberto Baillères, is the current owner, since 1990.

References

Nuevo Progreso
Sports venues in Jalisco